The Turkish Ambassador to Japan is the official representative of the President of Turkey and the Government of Turkey to the Emperor of Japan and Government of Japan.

List of Turkish chiefs of mission to Japan 

 Hulusi Fuad Tugay (1925–1929)
 Cevat Ezine (1929–1931)
 Nebil Batı (1931–1936)
 Hüsrev Gerede (1936–1939)
 Ahmet Ferit Tek (1939–1943)
 Ali Muzaffer Göker (1944–1945)
 İzzet Aksalur (1952–1955)
 Semih Baran (1955–1957)
 Süreyya Anderiman (1957–1959)
 Nejad Kemal Kavur (1960–1962)
 Melih Esenbel (1963–1966)
 Turgut Aytuğ (1967–1970)
 Mustafa Şükrü Elekdağ (1970–1974)
 Celal Eyiceoğlu (1974–1979)
 Nazif Cuhruk (1979–1983)
 Nurver Nureş (1983–1987)
 Umut Arık (1987–1992)
 Necati Utkan (1992–1996)
 Gündüz Suphi Aktan (1996–1998)
 Yaman Başkut (1998–2002)
 Solmaz Ünaydın (2003–2007)
 Selim Sermet Atacanlı (2007–2011)
 Abdurrahman Bilgiç (2011)
 Serdar Kılıç (2012–2014)
 Ahmet Bülent Meriç (2014–2017)
 Hasan Murat Mercan (2017–present)

References 

Japan

Turkey